Öndög is a 2019 Mongolian drama film directed by Wang Quan'an. It was selected to compete for the Golden Bear at the 69th Berlin International Film Festival. It also won the Golden Spike for Best Picture at the Valladolid International Film Festival. It follows the story of a herder who is asked to guard a crime scene in Mongolia.

Cast
 Aorigeletu 		
 Dulamjav Enkhtaivan
 Norovsambuu

References

External links
 

2019 films
2019 drama films
Mongolian drama films
Films directed by Wang Quan'an